The Copyright Act 1957 as amended governs the subject of copyright law in India. The Act is applicable from 21 January 1958. The history of copyright law in India can be traced back to its colonial era under the British Empire. The Copyright Act 1957 was the first post-independence copyright legislation in India and the law has been amended six times since 1957. The most recent amendment was in the year 2012, through the Copyright (Amendment) Act 2012.

India is a member of most of the important international conventions governing the area of copyright law, including the Berne Convention of 1886 (as modified at Paris in 1971), the Universal Copyright Convention of 1951, the Rome Convention of 1961 and the Agreement on Trade Related Aspects of Intellectual Property Rights (TRIPS). Initially, India was not a member of the WIPO Copyright Treaty (WCT) and the WIPO Performances and Phonograms Treaty (WPPT) but subsequently entered the treaty in 2013.

Applicable Copyright Act before 1958

Prior to 21 January 1958, the Indian Copyright Act, 1914, was applicable in India and still applicable for works created prior to 21 January 1958, when the new Act came into force. The Indian Copyright Act, 1914 was based on the Imperial Copyright Act of 1911 passed by the Parliament of the United Kingdom, but was slightly modified in terms of its application to Indian law. According to this Act, the period of copyright for photographs was 50 years from the time it was first published. (Act language is: "the term for which copyright shall subsist in photographs shall be fifty years from the making of the original negative from which the photograph was directly or indirectly derived, and the person who was owner of such negative at the time when such negative was made shall be deemed to be the author of the work, and, where such owner is a body corporate, the body corporate shall be deemed for the purposes of this Act to reside within the parts of His Majesty's dominions to which this Act extends if it has established a place of business within such parts.") For photographs published, before 21 January 1958 in India, the period of copyright is thus 50 years, as for them the old Act is applicable.

Definition of copyright
Copyright is a bundle of rights given by the law to the creators of literary, dramatic, musical and artistic works and the producers of cinematograph films and sound recordings. The rights provided under Copyright law include the rights of reproduction of the work, communication of the work to the public, adaptation of the work and translation of the work. The scope and duration of protection provided under copyright law varies with the nature of the protected work.

In a 2016 copyright lawsuit, the Delhi High Court states that copyright is "not an inevitable, divine, or natural right that confers on authors the absolute ownership of their creations. It is designed rather to stimulate activity and progress in the arts for the intellectual enrichment of the public. Copyright is intended to increase and not to impede the harvest of knowledge. It is intended to motivate the creative activity of authors and inventors in order to benefit the public."

Types of works protected
The Indian copyright law protects literary works, dramatic works, musical works, artistic works, cinematograph films and sound recordings.

Duration of copyright protection under the Copyright Act 1957

Foreign works
Copyrights of works of the countries mentioned in the International Copyright Order are protected in India, as if such works are Indian works. The term of copyright in a work shall not exceed that which is enjoyed by it in its country of origin.

Ownership of copyright under the Copyright Act 1957
The author of a work is generally considered as the first owner of the copyright under the Copyright Act 1957. However, for works made in the course of an author's employment under a "contract of service" or apprenticeship, the employer is considered as the first owner of copyright, in the absence of any agreement to the contrary.

The concept of joint authorship is recognised in Section. 2(z) of the Act which provides that "a work produced by the collaboration of two or more authors in which the contribution of one author is not distinct from the contribution of the other author or authors" is a work of joint authorship. This concept has been elucidated in cases like Najma Heptulla v. Orient Longman Ltd. and Ors.

Section 19 of the Copyright Act 1957 lays down the modes of assignment of copyright in India. Assignment can only be in writing and must specify the work, the period of assignment and the territory for which assignment is made. If the period of assignment is not specified in the agreement, it shall be deemed to be 5 years and if the territorial extent of assignment is not specified, it shall be presumed to be limited to the territories of India. In a recent judgement (Pine Labs Private Limited vs Gemalto Terminals India Limited), a division bench of the Delhi High Court confirmed this position and held that in cases wherein the duration of assignment is not specified, the duration shall be deemed to be five years and the copyright shall revert to the author after five years.

Exceptions to copyright infringement in India
The Copyright Act 1957 exempts certain acts from the ambit of copyright infringement. While many people tend to use the term fair use to denote copyright exceptions in India, it is a factually wrong usage. While the US and certain other countries follow the broad fair use exception, India follows a different approach towards copyright exceptions. India follows a hybrid approach that allows : 
 fair dealing with any copyrighted work for certain specifically mentioned purposes and  
 certain specific activities enumerated in the statute.

While the fair use approach followed in the US can be applied for any kind of uses, the fair dealing approach followed in India is clearly limited towards the purposes of 
 private or personal use, including research, and education,
 criticism or review, 
 reporting of current events and current affairs, including the reporting of a lecture delivered in public.

While the term fair dealing has not been defined anywhere in the Copyright Act 1957, the concept of 'fair dealing' has been discussed in different judgments, including the decision of the Supreme Court of India in Academy of General Education v. B. Malini Mallya (2009) and the decision of the High Court of Kerala in Civic Chandran v. Ammini Amma.

IBomma is a website which releases movies for free illegally. It copies movies of streaming services such as Prime Video, Netflix etc. Surprisingly no one has lodged a complaint against this torrent website which has been running for a long time. In September 2016, the Delhi High Court ruled in Delhi University's Rameshwari Photocopy Service shop case, which sold photocopies of chapters from academic textbooks was not infringing on their publisher's copyright, arguing that the use of copyright to "stimulate activity and progress in the arts for the intellectual enrichment of the public" outweighed its use by the publishers to maintain commercial control of their property. However, in December 2016, the ruling was reversed and taken back to court, citing that there were "triable issues" in the case.

Remedies available against copyright infringement in India
The Copyright Act 1957 provides three kinds of remedies - administrative remedies, civil remedies and criminal remedies. The administrative remedies provided under the statute include detention of the infringing goods by the customs authorities. The civil remedies are provided under Chapter XII of the Copyright Act 1957 and the remedies provided include injunctions, damages and account of profits. The criminal remedies are provided under Chapter XIII of the statute and the remedies provided against copyright infringement include imprisonment (up to 3 years) along with a fine (up to 200,000 Rupees).

Jurisdiction [Place of Suing] Under Copyright Act, 1957 - in 2015 the jurisdiction law regarding copyright violation underwent significant change through the judgement of the Supreme Court in the 2015 case Indian Performing Rights Society Ltd. Vs. Sanjay Dalia – If cause of action has arisen wholly or in part in place where plaintiff resides or is doing business suit has to be filed at such place – Plaintiff cannot drag defendant to far off place under guise that he carries business there also. --- Interpretation of statutes – Mischief Rule – Construction that suppresses even counter mischief has to be adopted.

See also
Registrar of Copyrights (India)
 National Data Sharing and Accessibility Policy – Government of India

References

Bibliography 

 
 The Copyright Act, 1957

Further reading

External links 

 Official website of Registrar of Copyright 
 Indian Copyright Act, 1957: Full text 
 A Handbook of Copyright Law 
 Copyright (Amendment) Act, 2012
 Copyright Rules, 2013
 Copyright law in India

India
Law of India
Indian intellectual property law